The 2016 Vuelta a España was a three-week Grand Tour cycling stage race that took place in Spain between 20 August and 11 September 2016. The race was the 71st edition of the Vuelta a España and the final Grand Tour of the 2016 cycling season.

The race included 21 stages, beginning with a team time trial that started in Ourense. The subsequent stages included 10 summit finishes. The race ended in Madrid.

The overall winner was Nairo Quintana of team Movistar, with Chris Froome (Team Sky) second and Esteban Chaves (Orica–BikeExchange) third.

Teams 

The eighteen UCI WorldTeams were automatically invited and obliged to attend the race. The organiser of the Vuelta, Unipublic, was also able to invite four UCI Professional Continental teams – the second tier of professional cycling teams – as wildcards.

The teams entering the race were:

Route 

The route of the 2016 Vuelta was announced on 9 January 2016. In contrast to the two previous editions of the Vuelta, which had begun in Andalusia, this edition spent its first week in Galicia in the north-west of Spain. The first stage was a team time trial to Castrelo de Miño. The first significant climb of the race was at the end of the third stage, which was the first of ten summit finishes in the race. The route travelled through Asturias before coming to the Basque Country; the fourteenth stage, described by Cyclingnews.com as the hardest of the race, took place mainly just across the border in France. The route continued down the eastern coast of Spain over the next few days, with several mountainous stages, with the race's only individual time trial coming on stage 19. One more mountainous stage followed, finishing on the Alto de Aitana, before the riders travelled to Madrid for the closing stage on a circuit in the city centre.

Classification leadership 

The race included four principal classifications. The first of these was the general classification, which was calculated by adding up each rider's times on each stage and applying the relevant time bonuses. These were 10 seconds for the stage winner, 6 seconds for the rider in second, and 4 seconds for the rider in third, and 3, 2 and 1 seconds for the first three riders at each intermediate sprint; no bonuses were awarded on the time trial stages. The rider with the lowest cumulative time was the winner of the general classification and was considered the overall winner of the Vuelta. The rider leading the classification wore a red jersey.

The second classification was the points classification. Riders were awarded points for finishing in the top fifteen places on each stage and in the top three at each intermediate sprint. The first rider at each stage finish was awarded 25 points, the second 20 points, the third 16 points, the fourth 14 points, the fifth 12 points, the sixth 10 points, down to 1 point for the rider in fifteenth. At the intermediate sprints, the first three riders won 4, 2 and 1 points respectively. The rider with the most points won the classification and wore a green jersey.

The third classification was the mountains classification. Most stages of the race included one or more categorised climbs. Stages were categorised as third-, second-, first- and special-category, with the more difficult climbs rated higher. The most difficult climb of the race was given its own category as the Cima Alberto Fernández. Points were awarded for the first riders across the summit of each climb; the rider with the most accumulated points won the classification and wore a white jersey with blue polka dots.

The fourth individual classification was the combination classification. This was calculated by adding up each rider's position on the other three individual classifications. The rider with the lowest cumulative score was the winner of the classification and wore a white jersey.

The final classification was a team classification. This was calculated by adding together the times of each team's best three riders on each stage. The team with the lowest cumulative time was the winner of the classification. There was also a combativeness prize awarded on each stage; three riders were chosen on each stage by a race jury to recognise the rider "who displayed the most courageous effort". There was then a public vote to decide which rider would be awarded the prize; the rider wore a red dossard (race number) the following day. An identical procedure took place on the final stage to decide the most combative rider of the whole Vuelta.

 In stage three, Bryan Nauleau, who was second in the combination classification, wore the white jersey, because first-placed Laurent Pichon wore the polka-dot jersey as leader of the mountains classification.
 In stage four, Simon Pellaud, who was second in the mountains classification, wore the polka-dot jersey, because first-placed Alexandre Geniez wore the green jersey as leader of the points classification. Alejandro Valverde, who was second in the combination classification, wore the white jersey, because first-placed Rubén Fernández wore the red jersey as the leader of the overall classification.
 In stage five, Thomas De Gendt, who was second in the mountains classification, wore the polka-dot jersey, because first-placed Alexandre Geniez wore the green jersey as leader of the points classification. Lilian Calmejane, who was second in the combination classification, wore the white jersey, because first-placed Darwin Atapuma wore the red jersey as the leader of the overall classification.
 In stages 6–8, Alejandro Valverde, who was second in the combination classification, wore the white jersey, because first-placed Darwin Atapuma wore the red jersey as the leader of the overall classification.
 In stage ten, Alejandro Valverde, who was second in the combination classification, wore the white jersey, because first-placed David de la Cruz wore the red jersey as the leader of the overall classification.
 In stages 11–21, Chris Froome, who was second in the combination classification, wore the white jersey, because first-placed Nairo Quintana wore the red jersey as the leader of the overall classification.
 In stages twelve and thirteen, Omar Fraile, who was second in the mountains classification, wore the polka-dot jersey, because first-placed Nairo Quintana wore the red jersey as the leader of the overall classification.

Final standings

General classification

Points classification

Mountains classification

Combination classification

Team classification

Controversy 
In stage 15, more than 90 riders were 10 km/h slower than the winner and finished far outside of the time cut. They were, nevertheless, allowed to stay in the race. Of the six remaining stages, five were won by riders from that grupetto (Drucker, Frank, 2x Cort Nielsen, Latour), Froome being the only exception after winning the time trial (stage 19).

References

Sources

External links 
 

 
2016 in Spanish road cycling
2016 UCI World Tour
August 2016 sports events in Spain
September 2016 sports events in Spain
2016